Jaclyn Victor III is a studio album by Jaclyn Victor. The album was released in 2009 by Sony Music Entertainment Malaysia.

Track listing

"Koleksi Gemilang" is a medley of 24 Malaysian songs, and is a tribute from Jac to the music industry. Some of the 24 songs are Warisan Wanita Terakhir, Kau Ilham Ku, Kamelia, Sekadar Di Pinggiran, Terasing, Gadis Melayu, Di Sana Menanti Di Sini Menunggu, Menaruh Harapan, Aku Cinta Padamu and more.

References

2009 albums
Jaclyn Victor albums
Sony Music albums
Malay-language albums